Ranil Sriyan Wickremesinghe (born 24 March 1949) is a Sri Lankan politician who is the 9th and current president of Sri Lanka. He also holds several ministerial positions, including the Minister of Finance, Minister of Defence, Minister of Technology and Minister of Women, Child Affairs and Social Empowerment. 

Wickremesinghe has led the United National Party since 1994. He has served as Prime Minister of Sri Lanka on five separate occasions, leading six governments, from 1993 to 1994, 2001 to 2004, 2015 to 2018, 2018 to 2019, and for a few months in 2022. He has also served as Leader of the Opposition from 1994 to 2001 and from 2004 to 2015.

Born to a wealthy political family, he graduated from University of Ceylon and qualified as an advocate from the Ceylon Law College in 1972. Entering active politics in the mid-1970s with the UNP, he was first elected to Parliament from the Biyagama electorate in the 1977 parliamentary elections and was appointed Deputy Minister of Foreign Affairs, by his uncle and President J. R. Jayewardene. He was thereafter appointed as the Minister of Youth Affairs and Employment, becoming the youngest cabinet minister in Sri Lanka.

In 1989, President Ranasinghe Premadasa, appointed Wickremesinghe as the Minister of Industry, Science and Technology and Leader of the House. He succeeded D. B. Wijetunga as Prime Minister in 1993 following the assassination of Premadasa and Wijetunga's succession to the presidency. He was appointed Leader of the Opposition in November 1994 following the assassination of Gamini Dissanayake during the campaign for the 1994 presidential election. Wickremesinghe was the UNP nominee in the 1999 and 2005 presidential elections, but was defeated by Chandrika Kumaratunga and Mahinda Rajapaksa, respectively.

On 8 January 2015, Wickremesinghe was appointed as prime minister by President Maithripala Sirisena, who had defeated President Mahinda Rajapaksa in the 2015 presidential election. His coalition alliance, the United National Front for Good Governance, won the 2015 parliamentary election with 106 seats. Although it fell short of an outright majority, Wickremesinghe was re-elected as Prime Minister, with over 35 Sri Lanka Freedom Party members joining his cabinet. Wickremesinghe was removed as Prime Minister on 26 October 2018 by President Maithripala Sirisena with the appointment of former President Mahinda Rajapaksa as Prime Minister, which Wickremesinghe refused to accept, resulting in a constitutional crisis. The crisis ended with Sirisena re-appointing Wickremesinghe as Prime Minister on 16 December 2018. He resigned as Prime Minister on 20 November 2019, and was again succeeded by Mahinda following the 2019 presidential election. He contested the 2020 parliamentary election but failed to secure a seat in Parliament.

He re-entered Parliament as a National List MP of the United National Party, and was sworn in as a member of parliament on 23 June 2021. In May 2022, Wickremesinghe was re-appointed as prime minister by President Gotabaya Rajapaksa. On 9 July 2022, Wickremesinghe announced that he was willing to resign amidst mass anti-government protests that saw his personal residence set ablaze, along with the residence of then-President Gotabaya Rajapaska taken over by protestors. He agreed to resign as prime minister once a new government is formed.

Wickremesinghe became the acting president on 13 July 2022, after his predecessor Gotabaya Rajapaksa fled the country. Rajapaksa resigned on 14 July 2022, and the next day, Wickremesinghe was sworn in as acting president of Sri Lanka. The same day, he decided to formally abolish the presidential standard and remove the style "His Excellency" when addressing the president. On 20 July 2022, Wickremesinghe was elected as the 9th President via an election by parliament. On 21 July 2022, he took the presidential oath in parliament as president of Sri Lanka.

Early life and education
Born on 24 March 1949 in Colombo, Wickremesinghe was the second son of Esmond Wickremesinghe and Nalini Wickremesinghe née Wijewardena. His father was a lawyer who became a press baron taking over the Lake House Group of newspapers. His grandfathers were Cyril Wickremesinghe of the Ceylon Civil Service and the press baron, D. R. Wijewardhena.

Wickremesinghe was educated at the Royal Preparatory School and at the Royal College, Colombo where he was a classmate and friend of Anura Bandaranaike, son of then Prime Minister S. W. R. D. Bandaranaike; and Dinesh Gunawardena, son of socialist leader Philip Gunawardena. Wickremesinghe entered the Faculty of Law of the University of Ceylon at its Colombo Campus which is now the University of Colombo. After graduation, he completed the law exams at the Ceylon Law College and took oaths as an advocate in 1972 after having apprenticed under H. W. Jayewardene, QC. He became an Attorney at law following the changes to the legal profession in 1973. Wickramasinghe received an honorary doctorate from Deakin University in Australia on 14 February 2017 for his significant contributions in reforms in economy, education and human rights.

Political career
Wickremesinghe joined the United National Party (UNP) and progressed through its ranks. He was appointed as the chief organizer of the Kelaniya Electorate in the mid-1970s, and was later appointed as the chief organizer of the Biyagama Electorate, which he won in the 1977 parliamentary elections and entered parliament. He was appointed Deputy Minister of Foreign Affairs in the new government of J. R. Jayewardene, and was soon promoted to the post of Minister of Youth Affairs & Employment on 5 October 1977, which made him the youngest cabinet minister of Sri Lanka. During his term as minister, he initiated the Sri Lanka National Guard and the National Youth Services Council (NYSCO), which provides vocational and career training to school leavers. Wickremesinghe was later made the Minister of Education on 14 February 1980.

Under the Presidency of Ranasinghe Premadasa, Wickremesinghe was appointed as the Minister of Industry on 18 February 1989, under which he initiated industrial reforms and established the Biyagama Special Economic Zone. In 1990, he was given the additional portfolios of Science and Technology. Wickremesinghe had competition from his senior colleagues in the UNP, Lalith Athulathmudali and Gamini Dissanayake, who had been rivals of President Premadasa. He was appointed the Leader of the House in 1989.

Batalanda incident

It was alleged by the People's Alliance government that Wickremesinghe, as Minister, was the political authority behind an illegal detention centre in the Batalanda housing and industrial complex outside Colombo between 1988 and 1990 which was allegedly run by a government-backed counter-subversive unit as part of the state's operation to put down an armed insurgency by the JVP. The People's Alliance government of President Chandrika Kumaratunga, appointed a Special Presidential Commission of Inquiry to investigate activities of Batalanda and on 3 September 1997 Wickremesinghe was summoned to testify before the commission. The commissions report was released on 12 April 1998. The commission was a fact-finding mission and had no judicial powers, however it recommended the government to "bring the guilty to book". One of its findings was that "Wickremesinghe and the SSP Nalin Delgoda, are indirectly responsible for the maintenance of places of unlawful detention and torture chambers in houses at the Batalanda Housing Scheme". It further stated that Wickremesinghe held "unauthorised meetings of police officers involved in counter-insurgency operations in the housing complex, and that as such, he had abused his authority". No criminal proceedings took place thereafter.

First premiership (1993–1994)
On 7 May 1993, Wickremesinghe was sworn in as prime minister after President Ranasinghe Premadasa was assassinated by the Tamil Tigers and Prime Minister D. B. Wijetunga was appointed president. During his ephemeral term, he was credited for pushing the country through an impressive economic transformation and was generally backed by the business community.

Opposition (1994–2001)
In the 1994 parliamentary elections, the UNP lost to Chandrika Bandaranaike Kumaratunga's People's Alliance (PA), and Kumaratunga was appointed Prime Minister of the country. Wickremesinghe was defeated in the race for Opposition Leader by two votes by fellow UNP member Gamini Dissanayake, who had re-joined the party. This gave Gamini Dissanayake the default leadership of the party and made him the presidential nominee of the UNP. The UNP was progressing well under Gamini Dissanayake's leadership, when he too was assassinated by the Tamil Tigers. Gamini Dissanayake's widow, Srima replaced him as the candidate of the UNP in the 1994 election. Securing just 35% of the vote, she lost to Chandrika Kumaratunga in all electorates except Mahiyangana. Afterwards, Wickremesinghe was appointed as the opposition leader as well as the UNP leader.

Wickremesinghe was seen as a cooperative opposition leader who gave the government a chance to carry out its agenda in its early days.

In the 1999 election, Wickremesinghe was nominated as UNP's presidential candidate. After a tense election campaign in the wake of the violent North Western Provincial Council election, the Tamil Tigers blasted a suicide bomb in an election campaign rally, in which President Kumaratunga lost her right eye. Voting was held two days later 21 December 1999 amidst a wave of sympathy, and Kumaratunga was re-elected with 51% of the popular vote to remain as Executive President. After this electoral loss, Wickremesinghe unsuccessfully led his party in the 2000 parliamentary elections, again losing out to the PA.

Second premiership (2001–2004)

In the parliamentary general election 2001, Ranil Wickremesinghe led UNF to win 109 seats and PA was able to obtain only 77 seats. Consequently, he was able to form a new UNF government and sworn as the 17th Prime Minister of Sri Lanka on 9 December 2001. However, Chandrika Kumaratunga still remained the President of the country. This led to a confusing situation where the President and the Prime Minister were from two opposite parties. Although, according to the constitution, both head of state and head of government was the President, Prime Minister Ranil Wickremesinghe was able to appoint his own cabinet and he had the actual control over the government. President Chandrika Kumaratunga also chaired cabinet meetings as de facto head, but her influence over decision making was strictly limited.

During his second premiership, he proposed to initiate the "Western Region Megapolis" project. Planned with the assistance of architects and town planners of a Singaporean firm CESMA, it proposed to build a large new city in the western province that can rival major cities in the world. However, the project did not proceed after the fall of his government. He also requested international community to assist in development during the ceasefire – the Tokyo Donor Conference on Reconstruction and Development of Sri Lanka was held in June 2003, during which Sri Lanka received more than 4.5 billion dollars in reconstruction and development aid.

Wickremesinghe's foreign policy during his tenant as Prime Minister pushed closer relations with the west. He expected their economical backing to overcome the economic crisis. He also largely took assistance, especially from Norway, to resolve the ongoing ethnic problem in Sri Lanka. In July 2002 he was able to meet George W. Bush, the President of the United States during that period. It was the first time after 18 years a Sri Lankan leader met the US leader in the White House. This visit was primarily focused on building new relationships based on economical links between United States and Sri Lanka. Furthermore, the US government pledged to support his peace efforts with LTTE. He also met the Prime Minister of the United Kingdom Tony Blair, the Prime Minister of Japan Junichiro Koizumi  and the Prime Minister of India Atal Bihari Vajpayee.

Wickremesinghe believed a political solution based on a United Sri Lanka was the permanent solution to the ethnic problem in the country. He also believed that such a solution could be reached through a peaceful negotiation process with LTTE. Three months after the election Ranil Wickremesinghe's government entered into a ceasefire agreement (CFA) with LTTE. The agreement was signed on 22 February 2002 at different locations in the war zone by both parties and the Norwegian Ambassador to Sri Lanka Jon Westborg acted as the facilitator. It was said that the main objective of this agreement was to find a negotiated solution to the ongoing ethnic conflict in Sri Lanka. Both parties agreed to halt all offensive military operations. An international monitoring mission called Sri Lanka Monitoring Mission (SLMM) was formed to inquire into any instance of violation of the terms and conditions of this agreement. In the aftermath of signing the CFA, the island was deemed a safe place once again, after decades of war. Especially the tourism industry experienced a significant escalation where the number of tourists arriving in the country was suddenly increased. The A9 Highway was reopened up to Kilinochchi on 15 February 2002 after 18 years.

A few days after LTTE proposed the Interim Self Governing Authority (ISGA), President Chandrika Kumaratunga sacked three ministers of the cabinet and took over the ministries using her constitutional powers, ending the uneasy coalition between her and the Prime Minister Ranil Wickremesinghe while he was out of the country. Addressing the nation she claimed that this decision was taken in the interest of national security. Janatha Vimukthi Peramuna also decided to ally with PA to defeat the Ranil Wickremesinghe's government which they claimed as a threat to the sovereignty of the country. Consequently, President Chandrika Kumaratunga dissolved the parliament on 7 February 2004 which effectively ended Ranil Wickremesinghe's regime.

Peace talks
After signing CFA, Ranil Wickremesinghe held a few rounds of peace talks with LTTE between 2002 and 2003. Prof. G. L. Peiris, minister Milinda Moragoda and minister Rauff Hakeem led the government delegation and LTTE theoretician Anton Balasingham, LTTE political wing leader S.P. Thamilselvan and military leader Karuna Amman led the LTTE faction during the peace talks. The Norwegian government acted as the chief facilitator during the peace talks. There were six rounds of peace talks which were held at different locations around the world:

 16–18 September 2002, Bangkok
 31 October-3 November 2002, Bangkok
 2–5 December 2002, Oslo
 6–9 January 2003, Bangkok
 7–8 February 2003, Berlin
 18–21 March 2003, Tokyo

After the Oslo round of peace talks in December 2003, a concluding statement was declared by the Norwegian facilitators which later became known as Oslo Declaration. In this statement it was stated that "both parties have decided to explore a political solution founded on internal self-determination based on a federal structure within a united Sri Lanka". This was considered one of the most significant incidents in the history of finding a political solution to the ethnic problem in Sri Lanka.

After the sixth round of peace talks in March 2003, LTTE abruptly withdrew from the peace talks. However, in October 2003 LTTE again showed some intentions of entering into the peace process, calling for an Interim Self Governing Authority (ISGA). The proposal was handed over to the government through Norwegian Ambassador Hans Brattskar.

Analysts saw Wickremesinghe was fanning the internecine feuds among the Tigers and systematically weakening them and a foreign policy intended to tighten the global dragnet against the LTTE. Agreements were signed with the US which allowed Sri Lanka to get assistance in terms of military training, military technology, intelligence, special training in counter-terrorism and direct monetary assistance for military development. During the ceasefire period United States Pacific Command assessment team conducted a study from 12–2 Sep, 002 to 24 October 2002, which made several recommendations to strengthen the capabilities of the Sri Lanka Army, Sri Lanka Navy and Sri Lanka Air Force in case of the peace process failing. After studying the weakness of the military the study recommended the use of cluster bombs (Which weren't banned until 2010 when the Cluster Munitions Convention came into effect)to destroy unarmoured area targets and recommended arming Kafirs and Mi-24 gunships with guided weapons in case of fighting close to enemy forces. The US also donated the SLNS Samudura during this time.

The opposition and the nationalistic movements of the country strongly opposed CFA and the overall peace process of Ranil Wickremesinghe's regime.  They continuously criticized and protested against CFA claiming it as a threat to the sovereignty of the country which ultimately leads the way to a separate state for LTTE, so-called Eelam. It was later claimed by Karuna Amman who defected from the LTTE during Ranil Wickremesinghe's regime that the LTTE dragged the peace talks to smuggle weapons and ammunition including aircraft.

LTTE continuously violated CFA in great many occasions. In August 2007 SLMM agreed that LTTE had violated CFA in total 3830 occasions while government of Sri Lanka had violated CFA in only 351 occasions. Several Sri Lankan Army intelligence operatives were allegedly killed by LTTE during this period.

Opposition (2004–2015)

In the 2004 Parliamentary Elections held on 2 April Ranil Wickremesinghe's UNF lost governmental office. Despite the expectation of a full six-year term, and planned projects cut short by the defeat, the UNP was optimistic that it could regain power in a future election. Within 14 months of UPFA's victory, the radical JVP wing's (composed of over 30 members) parting of ways with the government, left the UPFA's parliamentary composition well short of the required majority. He remained in the post of the Opposition Leader until 2015, when Maithripala Sirisena who was sworn in as the President, appointed him as the Prime Minister.

In December 2004, Wickremesinghe was chosen by the United National Party as its presidential candidate for Presidential Elections due in late 2005. The Supreme Court decided in August 2005 that the elections should be held that year despite the President's argument that her term would end in 2006. Mahinda Rajapaksa, then Prime Minister, was nominated as the Presidential candidate of the Sri Lanka Freedom Party. In the presidential election held on 17 November 2005, Wickremesinghe was defeated narrowly by Mahinda Rajapaksa, who gained 50.29% of the vote to Wickremesinghe's 48.43%. A large number of the minority Tamil population in the Northern and Eastern parts of the country, who were largely expected to back Wickremesinghe were prevented from voting by the LTTE, which had enforced a boycott of the polls.

With the success in defeating LTTE in war, the government held a series of provincial elections in 2008 and 2009 for 8 provincial councils (Eastern, North Central, Sabaragamuwa, North Western, Central, Western, Uva, and Southern). On all occasions, UNP was soundly defeated by a large margin by UPFA. Of all the elections UNP obtained only 30% of the total polled and UPFA was able to gain 59% of the total polled. The margin was 2,527,783compared to 180,786 in Presidential Election in 2005.

Ranil Wickremesinghe signed an Alliance Agreement with twelve other opposition parties in November 2009 and he announced that a common candidate would be fielded for the presidential election which would be held in 2010. Later, he announced that the former Army Commander, Sarath Fonseka had been selected as the common candidate and pledged to support him.

In August 2012, Minister of Health and SLFP general secretary Maithripala Sirisena alleged that during the 1994 presidential election campaign, all campaign details concerning the UNP presidential candidate Gamini Dissanayake were being secretly passed on to his opponent, Chandrika Kumaratunga by Wickremesinghe. Minister Sirisena made this disclosure while addressing an election committee meeting held at Siripura, Polonnaruwa. Sirisena asserted that he has ample proof to validate his claim and allegations. Consequently, both parties started to challenge each other for open media debates.

UNP along with several other parties and civil organizations signed an Understanding Agreement and decided to field the then Secretary-General of Sri Lanka Freedom Party, Maithripala Sirisena as the Common Candidate for the presidential election and the Common Candidate pledged to appoint Ranil Wickremesinghe, as the Prime Minister if he would win the election. In the elections held on 8 January 2015, Common Candidate Maithripala Sirisena was selected as the 6th President of Sri Lanka and on 9 January 2015 when he was sworn in, he appointed Ranil Wickremesinghe as the Prime Minister of the Sri Lankan Parliament.

Dissent within the UNP
After the defeat in the 2004 parliamentary election, a senior member of UNP and a former minister of Ranil Wickremesinghe's 2001–2004 government, Rohitha Bogollagama, switched sides and allied with the government. Soon after the defeat in the presidential election in 2005, Mahinda Samarasinghe and Keheliya Rambukwella defected to the government.

In 2007, Wickremesinghe established a memorandum of understanding (MOU) with the Mahinda Rajapaksa government agreeing to UNP's collaboration with the government on issues of national interest. However, shortly afterwards, 17 of the UNP's 60 members in parliament, including the group who had challenged Wickremesinghe's leadership, led by deputy leader Karu Jayasuriya crossed over to the governing UPFA ranks in parliament and were given ministerial appointments. The group consisted of senior members of UNP and many of them were former ministers of Ranil Wickremesinghe's 2001–2004 government: Karu Jayasuriya (Deputy Leader of UNP), M. H. Mohamed (former speaker of the parliament), Milinda Moragoda, G. L. Peiris, Bandula Gunawardane, Lakshman Yapa Abeywardena, Gamini Lokuge, P. Dayaratna, Mano Wijeyeratne, Rajitha Senaratne, R.A.D. Sirisena, Mahinda Wijesekara, Naween Dissanayake, Hemakumara Nanayakkara, R. M. Dharmadasa Banda, Neomal Perera and Chandrasiri Sooriyaarachchi. The defection of the party stalwarts to join the government continued thereafter with several members such as; Susantha Punchinilame, Mahinda Ratnatilaka, Nandimithra Ekanayake, Thilanga Sumathipala, R. Duminda Silva, Ravindra Randeniya and Ashoka Wadigamangawa. However, in late 2008, Jayasuriya crossed over once again to the opposition and was given back the deputy leader post.

In February 2008, Wickremesinghe was under pressure to step down from the party leadership to accept an advisory position, from a majority of the UNP's parliamentary group. In March, the UNP working committee decided to create a new post called Senior Leader of the party and appointed Wickremesinghe to the post. This was amid discussion with the UNP's parliamentary group about the need for the Wickremesinghe to relinquish his post (of party leader) so that a new leader could be appointed. However, in late March the party working committee decided that he should remain as the party leader.

Wickremesinghe was accused of being a dictator in UNP during his time as opposition leader. Udugama Sri Buddharakkitha Thero said that Wickremesinghe was acting like a dictator. On 2010, UNP MP Dayasiri Jayasekara accused that within the constitution of the UNP, Ranil Wickremesinghe Rajapaksa is not a democratic leader but a dictator. Former minister and UNP MP Mahinda Wijesekara commented that "We don't need a dictator in the party," saying that Wickremesinghe opposed party reforms.

More than 60 UNP MPs allegedly left the party during Wickremesinghe's leadership as opposition leader.

Third, fourth and fifth premierships (2015–2019)
Following the 2015 presidential election's UNP-led common candidate Maithripala Sirisena having won 51.28% of votes and under Memorandum of Understanding agreement, Wickremesinghe was appointed as prime minister for the 100-day program plan and this was his third term as Prime Minister of Sri Lanka. UNP/UNFGG-led by Wickremesinghe won the General Parliamentary Elections held on 17 August 2015, making himself the Prime Minister for his 4th term, with 106 seats in 225-member Parliament of Sri Lanka forming the government (though short of 7 seats to secure the simple majority of the Parliament) defeating the political rivalry UPFA leader and former President Mahinda Rajapaksa in his bid to return as prime minister after his defeat as president. Wickremesinghe also scored the highest preferential votes in the election with 500,556 votes, beating his rival Rajapaksa by a considerable margin whilst setting a new record as the candidate with the highest number of preferential votes in Sri Lankas' elections history.

Wickremesinghe vowed to regain the majority in the Parliament and make it as the United National Party's Government, at the same time he also promised to secure the futures of younger generations and instantly confirmed that the Government will launch 1 million jobs for the youth as well advancement for the education and health sectors will maintain as promised. He also took steps to develop the former war-zones by touring the affected areas and met civil activists to discuss the issues faced by the Jaffna civilians and schools and to expedite investigations of missing persons. He also took steps to uplift Northern Province communities and to improve their standard of living.

Wickremesinghe also restarted the Megapolis plan which he started in when he was PM in 2001–2004. Surbana was consulted to revise the master plan to suit newer needs. The Ministry of Megapolis and Western development was created for project and the project which expects to convert the currently unplanned Western Province into a major megapolis by 2030 with an estimated population of 8.4 million and expects to solve the issues concerning traffic congestion, waste management and slum dwellers in urban areas. Wickremesinghe also showed interest in Surbana creating a similar plan for Trincomalee in the Eastern province and an agreement was later signed with Surbana for the purpose.

Wickremesinghe proposed major economic reforms and proposed a knowledge based social market economy which will be built on social justice principles that will also focus on the availability of global opportunities for education and strengthening of the health system to face health concerns of the 21st century. He also planned on reducing high income disparity levels in the domestic economy and increasing exports. He launched a plan to reform state-owned enterprise, enter into trade agreements with India and China to increase market access and regain GSP+ to regain EU markets, restructure key investment promotion agencies, develop tourism, attract high spending tourists, and develop the rural economy. Special economic zones and a special financial and business hub in Colombo were also proposed.  Wickremesinghe also organized the Sri Lanka Economic forum 2016 with the presence of international investor and Founder Chairman of Open Society George Soros and Nobel Laureate Economist Joseph Stiglitz and many other experts such as Ricardo Hausmann. The forum was seen as a boost to the Sri Lankan economy and during the forum Soros decided to invest in Sri Lanka the initial investments were expected to be around $300 Million. He also launched a loan and grant scheme for small and medium enterprises named "Swa Shakthi" empower rural entrepreneurs and develop the rural economy. However, in 2017, during his tenure Sri Lanka recorded just 3.1% economic growth rate, the lowest for 16 years.

During the Rajapaksa regime which oversaw the rise of lawlessness and abuse of state power by Rajapaksa's government ministers and officers after the defeat of the regime, Prime Minister Wickremesinghe decided to set up the Financial Crimes Investigation Division. This led to arrest Basil Rajapaksa the younger brother of Mahinda Rajapaksa and his political henchmen who were involved in large-scale corruption also were arrested within months after forming the committee. However several  family members and friends of Rajapaksa were questioned by the FCID, Rajapaksa fears that his entire family and friends could be prosecuted and brought down to justice. Former President Rajapaksa asked President Sirisena over the pending charges against his family members and political associations be dropped. However, President Sirisena refused to drop the charges that were ongoing, The meeting between President Sirisena and former President Rajapaksa ended up unsuccessful over the President's refusal to consider the key demands of Rajapaksa to be appointed as Prime Ministerial candidate and the charges against his family members and close associations to be dropped. Rajapaksa's faction in SLFP criticised that the FCID were used as a tool to revenge on his associations and threatened to take legal action against FCID.

The United National Party led by Wickramasinghe suffered a landslide defeat in the 2018 local authority elections. His party was only able to secure 34 councils out of 340 total councils. Mahinda Rajapaksa’s proxy Sri Lanka Podujana Peramuna won 231 councils. After the election defeat some MPs of UNP and party members asked Ranil Wickramasinghe Rajapaksa to resign from the party leadership and Prime Minister position. Some media reported that President Maithripala Sirisena also urged Ranil Wickramasinghe Rajapaksa to resign from his position. On the evening of 26 October 2018, President Maithripala Sirisena appointed Mahinda Rajapaksa as Prime Minister after the United People's Freedom Alliance withdrew from the unity government. He also informed Ranil Wickremesinghe was removed from office. Wickremesinghe said he refused to accept the dismissal claiming that it was unconstitutional which triggered a constitutional crisis. Following rulings by the Supreme court and the Appeal court, Rajapaksa backed down and Wickremesinghe was re-instated at prime minister on 16 December 2018.

Following many internal party negotiations Wickremesinghe agreed to back Sajith Premadasa as the party candidate for the 2019 Sri Lankan presidential election. Premadasa was defeated by Gotabaya Rajapaksa who gained 52.25% of the votes against 41.99% by Premadasa.

Foreign policy

His foreign policy in his third premiership was aimed at re-balancing relations with India and the West that were strained during the previous regime and keeping good relations with China as well. He also chose to restart discussions to solve the Indo-Sri Lanka fishing dispute but strongly defended the Sri Lankan navy's right to shoot Indian fishermen that fish in Sri Lankan waters, stating:

His foreign policy was seen as moving away from the Rajapaksa government's isolationist policies, which distanced Sri Lanka from the western world. His policies were seen to attract investments and financial aid.

His government allowed a 99-year lease of a port to a Chinese company which caused protests in 2017.

He also worked to develop relations with Japan and Singapore, choosing them as his second and third foreign state visits after being elected as prime minister. During his visit to Japan, he promised to support Japan's bid to secure a seat on the United Nations Security Council and entered to a "comprehensive partnership" with Japan covering political, economic and security issues. During his visit to Singapore, in an interview with The Straits Times he invited Singaporean submarines and frigates to visit Sri Lanka.

Government bonds controversy 
In February 2015 CBSL advertised the sale of Rs. 1 billion in 30 year government bonds at a coupon of 12.5%, though several accounts erroneously cite an indicative rate of 9.5%. The sale was oversubscribed with 36 bids totaling Rs. 20 billion. The majority of bidders, 26, bidded for Rs. 100 million or less at a rate of 9.5%–10.5%. However, a few bidders, including Perpetual Treasuries Limited, wanted interest rates of 11%–12%. On 27 February 2015 the CBSL accepted Rs. 10 billion in bids at rates of 9.5%–12.5%. The issuing of ten times the advertised bonds, and at a higher than expected rate, was alleged to cost the Sri Lankan government an additional Rs. 1.6 billion ($10.6 million), though this was disputed by the Leader of the House of Parliament. A petition was lodged in the Supreme Court of Sri Lanka contesting the methodology used to allege such a loss. Perpetual Treasuries was issued, directly and indirectly, with Rs. 5 billion in bonds at 12.5%. Perpetual Treasuries was one of the primary dealers in the sale and is owned by son-in-law of the Governor of the Central Bank of Sri Lanka Arjuna Mahendran, who was appointed by Wickremesinghe.

On 28 October 2016 the Committee On Public Enterprises, after a lengthy investigation, found Mahendran responsible for the bond issue scam and recommended legal action be taken against him. However, President Maithripala Sirisena announced that he had appointed a Special Presidential Commission of Inquiry to further investigate the case. The commission handed over the report on Central Bank bond issuance to Sirisena on 30 December 2017, and the Presidential Secretariat made available the full report in PDF form from its website for public viewing. During the investigation Wickramesinghe had to appear before the Special Presidential Commission of Inquiry. A group of ministers from the President's party along with opposition MPs failed in a recent attempt to pass a motion of no-confidence against the Prime Minister in Sri Lanka's Parliament. On 15 March 2018 Colombo Fort Magistrate's Court issued an arrest warrant on Arjuna Mahendra on charges of criminal breach of trust for allegedly providing confidential information of the Central Bank of Sri Lanka to Perpetual Treasuries Limited.

Opposition (2019–2022)
Following his defeat, Premadasa left the party to form his own party, Samagi Jana Balawegaya from which he contested the 2020 Sri Lankan parliamentary election. Wickremesinghe led the remaining party members in the parliamentary election which was delayed by the COVID-19 pandemic. The 2020 parliamentary elections resulted in a landslide victory of the Sri Lanka Podujana Peramuna led by Mahinda Rajapaksa gaining 59.09% of the votes and securing 145 seats in parliament and the Samagi Jana Balawegaya gained 23.90% of votes and 54 seats. The United National Party suffering the worst defeat in its history received a total of 249,435 votes, which was 2.15% of votes cased. For the first time in its history, it failed to win a single seat in parliament, having only gained one national list seat. Wickremesinghe was sworn in as the national list member of parliament of the UNP on 23 June 2021.

Wickremesinghe actively continued to serve as vice chairman of the International Democrat Union and chairman of the Asia Pacific Democrat Union.

Sixth premiership (2022)
By May 2022, the country was in sovereign default and facing hyperinflation, leading to political and social unrest. With events leading to Mahinda Rajapaksa's resignation on 9 May 2022, due to the 2022 Sri Lankan protests, President Gotabaya Rajapaksa appointed Wickremesinghe as prime minister on 12 May 2022. He was assured the support of the Sri Lanka Podujana Peramuna members of parliament, while other parties refused to join his cabinet initially.

Reuters described Wickremesinghe as an "economic liberal who has experience dealing with the International Monetary Fund". Wickremesinghe has stated that he intends to form a national government with the participation of all political parties in the parliament and lead the country through the worst economic crisis in its history with less than one million USD in foreign reserves and unable to import essential fuel, food, and medicines, calling the months to come the most difficult in the country's history.

On 25 May, Wickremesinghe was appointed Minister of Finance, Economic Stability and National Policies.

On 9 July, Prime Minister's office announced that Wickremesinghe was ready to resign to make way for an all-party government as protesters stormed and burned his residence that day. Later in the evening, protesters broke into the 115 Fifth Lane– Wickremesinghe's private residence in Colombo and set it on fire.

Presidency (2022–present)

On 13 July, President Gotabaya Rajapaksa fled the country to Maldives, with Wickremesinghe claiming the charge of presidency in an acting capacity due to his premiership and imposing a state of emergency in Sri Lanka. Following Rajapaksa's official resignation, Wickremesinghe was sworn in as the acting president of Sri Lanka before Chief Justice Jayantha Jayasuriya on 15 July. Wickremesinghe, who had formerly been a National List MP with his party represented by only one seat in the Parliament, became the President, Prime Minister, Minister of Defense, Minister of Technology, and Minister of Finance all at the same time. Upon becoming the acting President, Wickremesinghe prohibited the usage of "His Excellency" as an honorific prefix for the President and officially abolished the usage of a Presidential flag.

On 20 July, he was elected as the 9th President of Sri Lanka by the Parliament of Sri Lanka in a secret ballot to serve the remainder of Rajapaksa's term, which was supposed to end in November 2024. He defeated his main rival, Dullus Alahapperuma, with 134 votes to 82. On 21 July, he sworn in as the ninth (eighth executive) President of Sri Lanka at Parliament premises before Chief Justice Jayantha Jayasuriya. A day later, he appointed Dinesh Gunawardena as the Prime Minister.

In September 2022 Wickremesinghe visited the UK as the head of state to attend the funeral of Queen Elizabeth II, at the invitation of King Charles III.

Crackdown on anti-government protests
Soon after he was appointed as the president, Wickremesinghe vowed to crack down on the 2022 anti-government protests. Wickremesinghe claimed the protestors to be "fascists". Security forces raided the protest site in Galle Face Green in the early hours of 22 July, a day after Wickremesinghe was sworn in. 50 protestors were injured and two were hospitalised. BBC journalists were also attacked during the raid. Saliya Pieris, president of the Bar Association of Sri Lanka, condemned the raid. British High Commissioner to Sri Lanka, Sarah Hulton, also expressed concerns.

Handling of economic crisis 
Wickremesinghe continued the government policies for economic recovery initiated during the last few days of his predecessor's term. His administration continued power rationing and introduced fuel rationing to control the country's energy crisis, while increasing direct taxes with the aim of increasing government revenue to secure an IMF bailout package by late 2022. These tax increases were largely unpopular and triggered protests organized by the effected sectors. 

Sri Lanka saw a contraction of 11% of its economy in 2022, with inflation peaking at 54% in December 2022. Wickremesinghe was criticised for hosting celebrations of the 75th anniversary of Sri Lankan independence on 4 February 2023, while the country was amidst a crisis.

Family and personal life
Wickremesinghe married Maithree Wickremesinghe, Sri Lankan academic and Professor of English in 1994. Wickremesinghe has made several efforts to keep his private life out of politics. His personal life is rarely publicized or discussed. Maithree Wickremesinghe avoided the political spotlight until Wickremesinghe's re-election as prime minister in 2015.

His paternal grandfather was Cyril Leonard Wickremesinghe, of the Ceylon Civil Service who was the first Sinhalese Land Commissioner and his grandmother was Esme Moonemalle Goonewardene, daughter of Proctor Edward Goonewardene and Ada Moonemalle of Moonemalle Walawwa, Kurunegala whose brother was Theodore Barcroft L. Moonemalle Proctor and Member of the Legislative Council of Ceylon.

His maternal grandfather was D. R. Wijewardena son of Muhandiram Tudugalage Don Philip Wijewardena and Helena Wijewardena nee Dep Weerasinghe. His grandmother was Alice Ruby Meedeniya, daughter of J. H. Meedeniya Adigar of Meedeniya Walawwa, Ruwanwella and Corneliya Magdleine Senanayake whose mother was Corneliya Regina Senanayake nee Obeyesekere, sister of Lambertus Obeyesekere Maha Mudaliyar of Kataluwa Walawwa.

A number of Wickremesinghe's close relations were active in the government. His cousins Ruwan Wijewardene was the State Minister of Defence, Wasantha Senanayake was the State Minister of Foreign Affairs and his aunt Amari Wijewardene was the Sri Lanka High Commissioner to the United Kingdom.

Honours
 Robert E. Wilhelm Fellow – Massachusetts Institute of Technology (2014)
 Doctor of Laws (honorary) – Deakin University (2017)

See also
 List of political families in Sri Lanka
 List of international prime ministerial trips made by Ranil Wickremesinghe
 List of international presidential trips made by Ranil Wickremesinghe

Notes

References

Further reading
 Ranil Wickramasinghe (2005), Desapalanaya saha dharmaya, Publisher: Nugeegoda Sarasavi Prakasanayo, 
 Jayaratna, A. E. (2005), Ranil Wickramasinghe: Darshanaya Saha Saame Mawatha,

External links
 Ranil Wickremesinghe's MP profile at Parliament of Sri Lanka website
 

|-

 
1949 births
Acting presidents of Sri Lanka
Alumni of Royal College, Colombo
Alumni of Royal Preparatory School
Alumni of the University of Ceylon (Colombo)
Candidates in the 2022 Sri Lankan presidential election
Candidates in the 2005 Sri Lankan presidential election
Candidates in the 1999 Sri Lankan presidential election
Ceylonese advocates
Culture ministers of Sri Lanka
Deputy ministers of Sri Lanka
Education ministers of Sri Lanka
Finance ministers of Sri Lanka
Industries ministers of Sri Lanka
Leaders of the Opposition (Sri Lanka)
Leaders of the United National Party
Living people
Sri Lankan Buddhists
Members of the 8th Parliament of Sri Lanka
Members of the 9th Parliament of Sri Lanka
Members of the 10th Parliament of Sri Lanka
Members of the 11th Parliament of Sri Lanka
Members of the 12th Parliament of Sri Lanka
Members of the 13th Parliament of Sri Lanka
Members of the 14th Parliament of Sri Lanka
Members of the 15th Parliament of Sri Lanka
People from Colombo
Presidents of Sri Lanka
Prime Ministers of Sri Lanka
Sinhalese lawyers
Sinhalese politicians
Member of the Mont Pelerin Society